Fegth is a Norwegian surname. Notable people with the surname include:

 Hannibal Fegth (1879–1967), Norwegian rower
 Jacob Fegth (1761–1834), Norwegian merchant and ship-owner

See also
 Feith

Norwegian-language surnames